East Hedleyhope is a village in County Durham, in England.
The main village comprises two streets, West View and Deerness View; there are also a few houses on the other side of the football pitch. In total there are approximately forty homes.

Economy
Historically, East Hedleyhope was a mining village and had a larger population.

Transport
The village is the terminus of the 52 bus service with a frequent service to Durham.

Public services
There is a thriving community with many social events which occur in the modern village hut. The young residents have good facilities such as the playground and the football pitch.

References

Villages in County Durham